Calea kingii is a species of shrub in the aster family, Asteraceae. It is endemic to Ecuador, where it is known from five subpopulations in the high-elevation forests of the central Andes. It is threatened by habitat destruction.

References

kingii
Endemic flora of Ecuador
Vulnerable plants
Taxonomy articles created by Polbot